The Mumbai High Field, formerly called the Bombay High Field, is an offshore oilfield  off the west coast of Mumbai, in Gulf of Cambay region of India, in about  of water.  The oil operations are run by India's Oil and Natural Gas Corporation (ONGC).

Mumbai High field was discovered by an Indo-Soviet oil exploration team operating from the seismic exploration vessel Academic Arkhangelsky during mapping of the Gulf of Khambhat (earlier Cambay) in 1964–67, followed by a detailed survey in 1972.  The naming of the field is attributed to a team from a survey run in 1965 analysed in the Rashmi building in Peddar Road, Cumballa Hill, Mumbai. The first offshore well was sunk in 1974.

Every oil resource rock requires Structural traps which are mainly salt dome, coral reefs, fault trap and fold trap. In case of Mumbai High, the structure is a "north-northwest to south-southeast trending doubly plunging Anticline with a faulted east limb", 65 km long and 23 km wide", and is the most probable reason to call it "Mumbai High".

Geology
This is a carbonate reservoir, the main producing zone, L-III, consisting of sedimentary cycles of lagoonal, algal mound, foraminiferal mound and then coastal marsh, capped by a post-middle Miocene shale.

Production

Mumbai High Field reached its peak production level of 20 million tonnes per year in 1998.

As of 2004, it supplied 14% of India's oil requirement and accounted for about 38% of all domestic production.

On 27 July 2005, a major fire destroyed the production platform, leaving at least 22 people dead despite rescue measures taken by the Indian Coast Guard. Rebuilding this was expected to take upwards of 4 months and estimated to cost around ₹1,200 crore or US$300 million.

ONGC approved construction of seven pipelines with risers and associated top-side facilities in MHN in April 2007. These pipelines are vital for optimum utilisation from Mumbai High.

Crude oil produced from Mumbai High is considered to be of very good quality as compared to crudes produced in middle east. Mumbai High crude has more than 60% paraffinic content while light Arabian crude has only 25% paraffin.

ONGC temporarily suspended operations at two drilling rigs in the Mumbai High and Bassein fields after 54 employees tested positive for coronavirus and one died but the oil and gas production was not impacted.

As of 2020 Mumbai High and Bassein were India's top oil and gas producing fields, accounting for almost two-third of the country's production.

References

External links
Mumbai Offshore Basin

Oil fields in India
Energy in Maharashtra
India–Soviet Union relations
ONGC oil and gas fields